Dr. Donald E. Edgar  (born 1936) was the Foundation Director of the Australian Institute of Family Studies. Under his leadership the Institute had a profound influence on the Government of Australia regarding family policy, family and work, welfare policy and family law. He continues to contribute to Australian thinking in these areas through his own consulting practise and as an occasional columnist and commentator in the Australian media, particularly The Age and The Australian.

Career 
Edgar had been Professor in Sociology and Education at the University of Chicago, Reader (Assistant Professor) in Sociology at La Trobe University and Adjunct Professor with RMIT University's Centre for Workplace Culture Change. He has been a member of the Victorian Children's Council since 1996, and is an Ambassador for NARI, the National Ageing Research Institute.

His topics of interest include:
Australian national identity in a globalised world
Business partnerships and community networks
Children, schools and the knowledge economy
Men as fathers and managing work-family responsibilities
The changing nature of community, family and work
Ageing and ageing policy
Edgar was awarded the Medal of the Order of Australia (OAM) in the 2010 Queen's Birthday Honours.

Publications 

 Art for the Country: The story of Victoria's regional art galleries, Australian Scholarly Publishing, 2019

PEAK: Reinventing middle age, co-authored with Patricia Edgar, Text Publishing, 2017
The New Child: In search of smarter grown-ups, co-authored with Patricia Edgar, Wilkinson Publishing, 2008
War over work: the future of work and family, 2005, Melbourne University Press
The Patchwork Country: Rethinking Government, Rebuilding Community, Harper Collins, 2001
Promoting the positive: family-community resourcing as a model for family services, 1999
Men, Mateship, Marriage, 1997, Harper Collins
Ageing, everybody's future, 1991
Seen but not heard: eye-opening insights into the lives of young, 1989
Australian families and their children: a new and challenging audience, c1985
Possible directions for an Australian family policy, 1980
Introduction to Australian society: a sociological perspective, 1980, Prentice-Hall
Possible directions for an Australian family policy, 1980
Defining rural schools disadvantage 2: collected papers on rural education, 1979
Social class differences and the structure of education, 1976
Schools Commission and rural disadvantage, 1975
Preparing teachers for change, 1975
Adolescent competence and sexual disadvantage, 1974
Competence for girls?, 1972
Examination marks: their use and interpretation, 1964, Hall's
School organization and colleague relationship, nd
Australia and Her Northern Neighbours, Hall's, 1962

Jointly
The New Child: In search of smarter grownups, 2008, with Patricia Edgar, Wilkinson Publishing
' PEAK: Reinventing middle age', with Patricia Edgar, Text Publishing, 2017
Today's child care, tomorrow's children!, with Gay Ochiltree, c1995, AIFS
Songs of innocence: a child's view of family life: a discussion paper and study guide, with Annemaree O'Brien, c1994, ACTF
Family-friendly front: a review of Australian and international work and family research, with Kate Spearritt, 1994
Families in the 1990s: a challenge for future policy approaches (background paper prepared by Don Edgar and staff of the Australian Institute of Family Studies for the Social Policy Directorate), 1993
Introduction to Australian society, with Leon Earle, Rodney Fopp, c1993, Prentice-Hall
Family change and early childhood development, with Gay Ochiltree, 1983, AIFS
Children's participation in divorce, with Margaret Harrison, c1983, AIFS
One-parent families and educational disadvantage, with Freya Headlam, c1982, AIFS
Family change and early childhood development, with Gay Ochiltree, 1982, AIFS
Changing face of childhood, with Gay Ochiltree, c1981, AIFS
Family and the pre-school child, with Gay Ochiltree, 1980, AIFS
First year out teaching with Patricia Edgar and Dave McRae, 1973
'The New Child: In search of smarter grown-ups', with Patricia Edgar, Wilkinson 2008

Editor
Competent teacher, edited by Donald E. Edgar, 1974, Angus & Robertson
Social change in Australia: readings in sociology, ed Don Edgar, 1974, Cheshire
Sociology of Australian education: a book of readings, editor, 1975, McGraw Hill

References

External links
Don Edgar website

Australian consultants
1936 births
Living people
Academic staff of RMIT University
Recipients of the Medal of the Order of Australia